Yugoslavia participated for the last time in the Eurovision Song Contest 1992, held in Malmö, Sweden as the Federal Republic of Yugoslavia (consisting of Serbia and Montenegro). The last Yugoslav representative was Extra Nena with the song "Ljubim te pesmama".

Before Eurovision

Jugovizija 1992 
The national final was held on 28 March 1992 in the RTV Belgrade Studios in Belgrade. The show was hosted by Dragana Katić and Radoš Bajić. There were 20 songs in the final from the five remaining subnational public broadcasters;  RTV Belgrade, RTV Montenegro,  RTV Prishtina,  RTV Novi Sad and  RTV Sarajevo. RTV Sarajevo still participated although Bosnia and Herzegovina had already declared independence prior to the national final. The winning song was chosen by an expert jury, which included Lola Novaković, who represented Yugoslavia in Eurovision Song Contest 1962. The voting system remained the same as in previous years: each of the jurors gave points to their favorite songs according to a system with the ascending format of going from 1-3, 5 and finally 7 points. The winner was the Serbian singer Extra Nena with the song "Ljubim te pesmama", composed by Radivoje Radivojević and written by Gale Janković.

At Eurovision
Extra Nena performed 20th on the night of the contest, following Italy and preceding Norway. At the close of voting, it had received a total of 44 points, placing 13th in a field of 23 competing countries. The Yugoslav jury awarded its 12 points to Israel.

Voting

After Eurovision
This was the final participation of Yugoslavia at Eurovision Song Contest. The FRY was finally readmitted to the EBU on July 1, 2001 after gaining recognition from the United Nations and the International Telecommunication Union.

Newly-formed republics, Bosnia and Herzegovina, Croatia and Slovenia then appeared independently beginning with the 1993 contest, North Macedonia joined the 1998 contest and finally Serbia and Montenegro joined the contest in 2004.

Notes

References

Bibliography

External links
Eurovision Song Contest National Finals´ Homepage
Eurovision France
ECSSerbia.com
European Broadcasting Union

1992
Countries in the Eurovision Song Contest 1992
Eurovision